Wake Me Up is an EP by American singer Aloe Blacc. It was released as a solo version after the big success of "Wake Me Up!" by Avicii. The similarly-titled Aloe Blacc EP Wake Me Up (without the exclamation mark) includes an acoustic version of "Wake Me Up!". It was released on October 22, 2013 on Aloe Blacc Recording, Inc. under exclusive license to XIX Recordings LLC / Interscope Records. The EP release was successful in its own right charting on a number of singles charts, notably Belgium, France, the Netherlands and Switzerland.

EP track list
All five tracks including "Wake Me Up" were solo interpretations by Aloe Blacc.

Chart performance

Single: Wake Me Up

Besides appearing in the Wake Me Up EP as track number 2 in the 5-track EP, the song "Wake Me Up" was available as a Promo stand-alone single on Interscope Records and made available online for downloads via iTunes. The track also appears in Aloe Blacc studio album Lift Your Spirit.

A music video of Blacc's solo version was launched as a music video in collaboration with the immigrant rights group National Day Laborer Organizing Network and the ABC* Foundation's Healing Power of Music Initiative. The music video was directed by Alex Rivera and the cast were real life immigrant activists.

References

2013 EPs
Albums produced by Pharrell Williams